The following is a timeline of the history of the city of Samarra, Iraq.

Prior to 16th century
 836 – Samarra established and the Abbasid caliph Al-Mu'tasim relocated capital from Baghdad to Samarra.
 848 – Great Mosque of Samarra built 
 859 – Abu Dulaf Mosque built 
 861 – 11 December: Caliph Al-Mutawakkil assassinated.
 868 – The Islamic scholar and the 10th imam from the Twelve Imams Ali al-Hadi died in Samarra on 21 June.
 861 – 870 Caliphal Civil War, was an armed conflict during the "Anarchy at Samarra"
 874 – The Islamic scholar and the 11th imam from the Twelve Imams Hasan al-Askari died in Samarra on 4 January 
 892 – Abbasid caliph  Al-Mu'tamid relocated capital to Baghdad from Samarra.
 1258 – Samarra occupied by Mongol Empire forces

16th–19th centuries
 1508 – Shah of Iran Ismail I visited Al-Askari Shrine after his army had occupied Samarra city 
 1553 – The Ottoman admiral Seydi Ali Reis visited Al-Askari Shrine in the town 
 1705 – The Ottoman governor of Baghdad Hassan Pasha visited Al-Askari Shrine in the town 
 1733 – Battle of Samarra between Safavid Empire and Ottoman Empire on July 19 and Ottoman Empire got victory 
 1785 – The Wall of Samarra built around the city
 1870 – Shah of Qajar Iran Naser al-Din Shah visited Al-Askari Shrine 
 1874 – September: the Iraqi Shia marja Mirza Shirazi moved to Samarra  and spent his life there 
 1878 – The first bridge built at the Tigris in the city.
 1881 – The first elementary school opened 
 1890 – Mirza Shirazi's Hawza established 
 1895 – 20 February: The Iraqi Shia marja' Mirza Shirazi died in Samarra and burial in Imam Ali shrine in Najaf

20th century
 1917 – Samarra occupied by British forces on 23 April 
 1936 – The Wall of Samarra removed 
 1956 – Samarra Dam opened after three years had constructed 
 1965 – The State Company for Drugs Industry and Medical Appliances established .
 1973 – Samarra FC (football club) formed.

21st century
 2004 – Battle of Samarra on October.
 2006 – al-Askari mosque bombing on 22 February 
 2007 – al-Askari mosque bombing on 13 June 
 2011 – 12 February : bombing
 2012 – University of Samarra established.
 2014 – Battle of Samarra on June

References 

 
 

Years in Iraq
Samarra
Samarra
Samarra